Obinna Nwobodo  (born 29 November  1996) is a Nigerian professional footballer who plays as a midfielder for Major League Soccer club FC Cincinnati.

Club career

Early career
Nwobodo started his youth career with FC Inter Enugu while completing his high school education in Enugu State, Nigeria. He was scouted while representing his high school in a football competition and later played for FC Inter in the Nigeria Nationwide League (NNL) and State FA cup. During a preseason friendly between Enugu Rangers and FC Inter Enugu, he put in a man-of-the-match performance that troubled the six-time Nigerian league champions, who promptly negotiated a deal to have him play professionally for them during the 2015–16 league season.

Enugu Rangers
After signing for Enugu Rangers, Obinna was promoted straight into the first team within a matter of weeks. He was handed his preferred number 8 shirt and registered as a central midfielder. Moving straight into the starting eleven, Nwobodo started majority of the early season games, making his league debut in the season opener against Nigerian league giants Kano Pillars. He remained in the starting eleven afterwards with his playmaking and distribution helping take Rangers to the very top of the table during the 2016 season.

Nwobodo was instrumental to Enugu Rangers's eventual title triumph, providing half of the assists for Chisom Egbuchulam's 16 goals and ending Rangers' 32-year wait for a 7th league title. On matchday 37 against Ikorodu United, he scored a goal-of-the-season contender; having sighted the Ikorodu United goalkeeper off his line, he scored with a lofted chip shot from almost 40 yards out. The tally was later increased to two when Nwobodo again made a spectacular run down the right and then delivered a prefect cross for Egbuchulam to simply tap home. That man-of-the-match performance cemented his place in the team of the season. He contributed 7 goals and 10 assists to finish as arguably the best midfielder in the league in his first professional season in the top flight of Nigerian football. In December 2016, Nwobodo was presented with the best player award for his performance during the 2016 season by Enugu Rangers management.

FC Cincinnati 
On 13 April 2022, Nwobodo signed for Major League Soccer club FC Cincinnati as a Designated Player. He signed a contract through the 2024 season, with a club option for 2025.

Honours
Enugu Rangers
Nigeria Professional Football League: 2016
Nigeria U20

 African U-20 Championship: 2015

References

External links

1996 births
Living people
Nigerian footballers
Association football midfielders
Nigeria youth international footballers
Rangers International F.C. players
Újpest FC players
Nemzeti Bajnokság I players
FC Cincinnati players
Nigerian expatriate footballers
Expatriate footballers in Hungary
Expatriate footballers in Turkey
Expatriate soccer players in the United States
Nigerian expatriate sportspeople in Hungary
Nigerian expatriate sportspeople in Turkey
Nigerian expatriate sportspeople in the United States
Designated Players (MLS)
Major League Soccer players
Footballers from Enugu